Faith West Academy is a non-denominational, coeducational, private Christian school with grades preschool-12 with boarding facilities, located in unincorporated Harris County, Texas, near Katy. The school first began in 1982.

With 623 students and an annual budget of over $6 million, it was, circa 2001, one of the ten largest private schools in the greater Houston, Katy area.

Alumni include Ted Cruz, the junior United States senator from Texas, who attended but did not graduate from the school.

References

External links

 

Private K-12 schools in Harris County, Texas
Christian schools in Texas
Educational institutions established in 1982
1982 establishments in Texas